Opal Jean Amburgey (March 6, 1925 – August 12, 1995), known professionally as Jean Chapel, was an American country singer and songwriter. She recorded for several record labels and wrote over 400 songs, more than 170 of which were published in her lifetime.

Biography
Amburgey was born into a family of six children in Neon, Kentucky. At the age of 11, she learned guitar and banjo, and performed with her sisters as the Sunshine Sister band. Together, they left home when Jean was 13 and were hired to play daily on WKLP-AM in Lexington, Kentucky in 1938. They moved to Atlanta, Georgia in 1940 to sing on WSB Barn Dance; she began using the nickname Mattie at this time. Her sister Irene would later record with Capitol Records under the name Martha Carson.

In 1947, she married Salty Holmes, and in 1950 they moved to Chicago, Illinois to appear on National Barn Dance on WLS-AM. Soon Jean began appearing on the Grand Ole Opry opposite Holmes as Mattie & Salty under the name Mattie O'Neil.

In 1956, she recorded a few rockabilly recordings under the name Jean Chapel with Sun Records; one of the tunes, "Welcome to the Club", was issued as a B-side of a single by Elvis Presley. Sun promoted her as the Female Elvis, but the nickname stuck more successfully to Janis Martin.

After Chapel divorced Holmes in 1956, she moved to Nashville and devoted herself primarily to songwriting. She befriended Tammy Wynette, who would later briefly marry her brother, Don (shortly before her marriage to George Jones). Wynette asked her to record the duet "Crazy Me".

Chapel's greatest success in the music industry was as a songwriter, penning "Lonely Again", a number one song for Eddy Arnold. Chapel also wrote “Baby, That's Living”, which went number two in the U.S. She also wrote "Lay Some Happiness on Me", one of Dean Martin's most successful records of the 1960s and in 1973 her song "To Get to You", a hit for Jerry Wallace, was nominated for Song of the Year by the Country Music Association. Among the other artists to record Chapel songs are Liz Anderson, Nancy Sinatra, Tommy Overstreet, Charlie McCoy, and Lorrie Morgan.

Chapel died August 12, 1995 in Port Orange, Florida.

Discography

References
Footnotes

General references
[ Jean Chapel] at Allmusic

American women country singers
American country singer-songwriters
American rockabilly musicians
Sun Records artists
RCA Victor artists
Challenge Records artists
Crest Records artists
Apex Records artists
Smash Records artists
Country musicians from Kentucky
1925 births
1995 deaths
People from Port Orange, Florida
20th-century American singers
Singer-songwriters from Kentucky
Singer-songwriters from Florida
Kentucky women musicians
Singers from Kentucky
20th-century American women singers
Country musicians from Florida